Edward Tiberius James (born August 4, 1961) is an American murderer and sex offender. His appearance on the national television show America's Most Wanted led to his capture and conviction for the killings of an 8-year-old girl and her grandmother in September 1993.

Biography 
James was born in Bristol, Pennsylvania. He believed his last name was Matlack until the age of 10 when he discovered that the man raising him was his stepfather. At 11, James met and went to live with his biological father, who introduced him to drugs. Ironically, his father was a drug counselor. In his mid-teens, James returned to live with his mother in Casselberry, Florida. His life now revolved around fighting and drugs, and he claimed to have blackouts. His mother sought assistance from a mental health counselor; however, his violence and anger continued.

James dropped out of high school in his junior year and joined the U.S. Army when he was 17. He was stationed in Germany but was soon discharged for "failure to conform." James returned to Casselberry, where he became friends with a man named Tim Dick. James was welcomed into Dick's extended family, and, in the summer of 1993, he rented a room from Dick's mother, Betty.

Murders 
On September 20, 1993, James returned home from a party to find Betty Dick's four grandchildren sleeping in the living room. He grabbed 8-year-old Toni Neuner by the neck and strangled her, then took her to his bedroom and raped her, after which he put her body between his bed and the wall.

James proceeded to Dick's bedroom, where he hit her in the head with a candlestick and repeatedly stabbed her with a knife. Dick screamed, waking up Toni's sister, 9-year-old Wendi, who came to the bedroom. James tied Wendi up and put her in the bathroom. He got a butcher knife from the kitchen and returned to Dick's bedroom, sticking the knife in her back. After showering and taking jewelry from Dick's bedroom, James fled in her car.

Apprehension and sentencing
On September 28, 1993, America's Most Wanted (AMW) broadcast information related to the case, resulting in hundreds of viewer phone calls. Several tips indicated that he was traveling west. On October 5, 1993, AMW rebroadcast the details of the case, including this updated information. The next day, a viewer spotted James at the California state unemployment office in Bakersfield and contacted authorities. Once in police custody, he gave two taped statements.

On April 5, 1995, James pleaded guilty to two counts of first-degree murder, and one count each of aggravated child abuse, attempted sexual battery, kidnapping, grand theft and grand theft auto. He also pleaded no contest to two counts of capital sexual battery charged by separate information.

On August 18, 1995, James was sentenced to death for the murders of Toni Neuner and Betty Dick, as well sentences ranging from 15 years to life on the other charges. He is incarcerated at Union Correctional Institution in Raiford, Florida.

See all
 List of death row inmates in the United States

Footnotes

References 

1961 births
1993 murders in the United States
Living people
People from Bristol, Pennsylvania
American people convicted of murder
American rapists
American prisoners sentenced to death
American prisoners sentenced to life imprisonment
Prisoners sentenced to death by Florida
Prisoners sentenced to life imprisonment by Florida
American murderers of children
People convicted of murder by Florida
United States Army soldiers
People from Casselberry, Florida